Związek Jedności Narodowej (English: Union/Association of National Unity) was a secret organization formed by followers of Prince Adam Jerzy Czartoryski.  A liberal-aristocratic fraction of the Polish Great Emigration, come into being on January 21, 1833. 

The association directed in emigration science, literature, pedagogic and charity organisations in partitioned Poland. In 1837 the association was transformed into the "Insurrectionary-Monarchist Society". 

Main activists:

 Adam Jerzy Czartoryski (leader)
 Stanisław Barzykowski
 Henryk Dembiński
 Karol Kniaziewicz
 Narcyz Olizar

See also
 Hotel Lambert

Organizations established in 1833
1830s in Poland
Great Emigration

Conservatism in Poland